Clément Bénech, (born 28 April 1991) is a French novelist. He wrote his first novel, L'été slovène in 2013, published through Groupe Flammarion. He published his second novel, Lève-toi et charme in 2015. He is from Paris and has studied journalism at the Sorbonne University.

His first readings were Éric Chevillard and Patrick Modiano.

Awards and honors 
 2013: nominated for the Prix Orange du livre

Bibliography 
 L'été slovène, Flammarion, 2013
 Lève-toi et charme, Flammarion, 2015

References

External links 
 Clément Bénech's blog
 La Dispute on France Culture
 Biography on Evene

1991 births
Living people
Writers from Paris
21st-century French novelists
Postmodern writers
French male novelists
21st-century French male writers
Lycée Fénelon Sainte-Marie alumni